Nososticta taracumbi is a species of Australian damselfly in the family Platycnemididae,
commonly known as a Melville Island threadtail. 
It is endemic to Melville Island, Northern Territory, where it inhabits streams.

Nososticta taracumbi is a small, slender damselfly, coloured black with bright blue and white markings in the male, and ochre-like colouring in the female.
Wings have a brown-yellowish tinge.

Gallery

See also
 List of Odonata species of Australia

References 

Platycnemididae
Odonata of Australia
Insects of Australia
Endemic fauna of Australia
Taxa named by J.A.L. (Tony) Watson
Taxa named by Günther Theischinger
Insects described in 1984
Damselflies